The 9th Ryder Cup Matches were held November 2–4, 1951 at Course No. 2 of the Pinehurst Resort in Pinehurst, North Carolina. The United States team won their fifth consecutive competition by a score of 9 to 2 points.

North Carolina hosted top-ranked Tennessee and the visiting Volunteers won in a rout, 27-0. 

It later hosted the U.S. Open in 1999, 2005, and 2014.

Format
The Ryder Cup is a match play event, with each match worth one point.  From 1927 through 1959, the format consisted of 4 foursome (alternate shot) matches on the first day and 8 singles matches on the second day, for a total of 12 points.  Therefore, 6½ points were required to win the Cup.  All matches were played to a maximum of 36 holes.

Teams
Source: 

This was the second and final Ryder Cup for Ben Hogan as a competitor, following 1947.  Although he won three majors in 1953, he declined to participate on that year's team. Hogan was a non-playing captain in 1949 and 1967.

In April 1951 the British P.G.A. appointed Arthur Lacey as non-playing captain and chose a selection committee of four which included Lacey and Bill Cox. In late-July eight players were selected: Bousfield, Daly, Faulkner, Hargreaves, Lees, Panton, Rees and Ward. The remaining two places were to be selected after the News of the World Match Play. The final two places were later given to Weetman and Adams, the finalists in the News of the World Match Play.

Friday's foursome matches

18 hole scores: Heafner/Burke: 2 up, Ward/Lees: 3 up, Snead/Mangrum: 5 up, Hogan/Demaret: 3 up.

Sunday's singles matches

18 hole scores: Burke: 6 up, Rees: 1 up, Heafner: 3 up, Mangrum: 6 up, Lees: 2 up, Hogan: 2 up, Alexander: 5 up, Snead: 4 up.

Individual player records
Each entry refers to the win–loss–half record of the player.

Source:

United States

Dutch Harrison did not play in any matches.

Great Britain

Jack Hargreaves did not play in any matches.

References

External links
PGA of America: 1951 Ryder Cup
About.com: 1951 Ryder Cup

Ryder Cup
Golf in North Carolina
Ryder Cup
Ryder Cup
Ryder Cup
Ryder Cup